The 1972–73 Liga Femenina de Baloncesto was the 10th edition of the Spanish premier women's basketball championship. It took place from 8 October 1972 to 25 March 1973. Twelve teams took part in the championship and Ignis Mataró won its second title. Medina Almudena was relegated, Filosofía and Standard too after losing the promotion. Águilas Schweppes renounced at the end of the season.

Regular season

Results

Promotion

References
Hispaligas

External links
Official website

Femenina
Liga Femenina de Baloncesto seasons
Spain
Spain